Sururi Gümen (July 20, 1920 – September 20, 2000) was a Turkish American illustrator. For many years he was an uncredited ghost artist behind Alfred Andriola's comic strip Kerry Drake, finally receiving co-credit in 1976.

He emigrated to the United States in 1955.

References

Turkish illustrators
American illustrators
Turkish comics artists
American comics artists
Turkish emigrants to the United States
1920 births
2000 deaths
Place of birth missing